Outwitted is a 1917 American silent drama film, directed by George D. Baker. It stars Emily Stevens, Earle Foxe, and Frank Currier, and was released on November 12, 1917.

Cast list
 Emily Stevens as Nan Kennedy
 Earle Foxe as Billy Bond
 Frank Currier as John Lawson
 Ricca Allen as Madame Estrelle
 Paul Everton as Ben Farraday
 Frank Joyner as Jim Kennedy
 Fred Truesdell as James Bond
 Joseph Burke as Butler

References

External links 
 
 
 

Silent American drama films
1917 drama films
1917 films
American black-and-white films
American silent feature films
Films directed by George D. Baker
Metro Pictures films
1910s English-language films
1910s American films